An insult is an expression, statement, or behavior, which is disrespectful or scornful.

Insult may also refer to:

 The Insult (novel) (1996 novel), a crime novel by Rupert Thomson
 Insult (film), a 1932 British drama film
 The Insult (film), 2017 Lebanese drama film directed by Ziad Doueiri.
 Insult (legal), the legal meaning of insult
 Insult (medical), the cause of mental or physical injury

See also
 Insult slap, a challenge issued through a slap
 Insult comedy, a genre of comedy
 Injury
 Humiliation
 Slight (disambiguation)